In algebraic geometry, a chordal variety of a variety is the union of all the chords (lines meeting 2 points), including the limiting cases of tangent lines.

References

Algebraic geometry